Oliver Roup is an entrepreneur and computer scientist originally from Toronto, Ontario, Canada. Roup is the founder and CEO of the content monetization service VigLink.

Professional and educational background
Before founding VigLink, Roup worked at Microsoft where he was responsible for directing products for media properties like Xbox Live Marketplace, Zune Marketplace, and MSN Entertainment. He has also served in roles at Echo networks, Paul Allen’s Vulcan Inc., the BBC’s iPlayer, and the Founders Fund. Some of his patents cover micro-transactions, media, and metadata.

Roup founded VigLink, a service that connects web publishers and bloggers with affiliate advertising solutions, in 2009 and is the company’s current CEO. In a January 2012 interview with Idea Mensch, he was quoted as saying that the inspiration for VigLink came when he “wrote a crawler to count links to Amazon on the web and found that less than 50% were enrolled in the affiliate program (meaning the publisher would be compensated if a purchase resulted from the click)” and that he viewed the discovery as “an indicator that there was room for improvement in the space. Publishers either weren’t aware that affiliate programs existed or found them too time consuming and difficult to use.”

Education
Roup holds a bachelor's and master's degree in computer science from MIT as well as a MBA from the Harvard Business School.

Leadership positions
In addition to being the founder and CEO of VigLink, Roup is on the board of directors for the Performance Marketing Association and chairs the Council on Content Monetization.

Early attempts at fundraising
Roup began to raise seed funding for his business ideas in 2009 during his final semester at Harvard Business School. After 95 pitches, Josh Kopelman at First Round Capital offered to invest in the business. He eventually decided to buy Driving Revenue, a competitor with strong sales, and was able to raise $1.1 million from investors.

Views on affiliate marketing
Roup has commented that he believes the area of affiliate marketing has become more mainstream. He cites the transition to mainstream practices as a reason for the term “affiliate marketing” being replaced by “content monetization” or “content-driven commerce.”  He has charted the growth of the industry from websites offering coupons to media service providers like Huffington Post providing affiliate marketing-oriented content.

References

Canadian chief executives
Canadian computer scientists
Businesspeople from Toronto
Living people
Harvard Business School alumni
MIT School of Engineering alumni
Year of birth missing (living people)